The city of Timmins, Ontario, Canada contains many named neighbourhoods. Some former municipalities that were merged into Timmins continue to be treated as distinct postal and telephone exchanges from the city core.

According to Barnes, "With the staking of the three great properties, The Porcupine came alive as hundreds of canoes bearing prospectors...Golden City and Pottsville sprang up, with South Porcupine soon to follow."

Barbers Bay
Barbers Bay is located on the southern shore of Frederick House Lake along the municipal boundary with Iroquois Falls. It also includes an area of bays dotted with cottages to the south, and just north of Kettle Lakes Provincial Park. Recently Barber's Bay has seen a growth in its year-long residents, most notably around the densely developed Finn Bay.

Connaught
A small village just west of Barbers Bay, where the Frederick House River flows into Frederick House Lake.  Sometimes all of the extreme eastern portion within Timmins' city limits (Barbers Bay, Hoyle and Connaught) is referred to as Connaught because the village contains the only post office in the area.  It borders both Iroquois Falls and Black River-Matheson.
Connaught was also the location of the Frederick House outpost of the Hudson`s Bay Company.

Hill District
Located in the northeast portion of Timmins, it is North of Algonquin Boulevard and generally East of the streets with names of trees.  It does not really have any precise boundaries, but much of it is located on a hill, thus its name.  Both Gillies Lake and the Timmins and District Hospital are located here.  The neighbourhood has some of the oldest houses in Timmins and used to be where the wealthiest people lived including mine managers.

Hoyle
Hoyle is a tiny hamlet and a series of farms located just north of Highway 101 near the Porcupine river, approximately 15 kilometres east of South Porcupine.

Kamiskotia
Located Northeast of Highway 101, Kamiskotia is home to the Kamiskotia Ski Resort, as well as many residential homes, and some cottages/camps located on Kamiskotia Lake and other smaller lakes. Due to the long winters in Timmins, Kamiskotia Ski Resort is a very popular winter attraction among residents and tourists.

Mattagami Heights
One of the early neighbourhoods in Timmins, it was first developed along the east bank of the Mattagami River in the 1910s by prospector Charles M Auer.  It is distinctive because all of it is on a hill overlooking the river, and the streets are somewhat hilly, unlike much of Timmins.  It is north of Algonquin Boulevard West and mainly west of Thériault Boulevard up to Vimy Avenue.  The McChesney Lumber Mill (now owned by EACOM) is located in this neighbourhood on the river.

Melrose
It is the northernmost subdivision in the urban core of Timmins, bounded by Jubilee Avenue, MacLean Drive and Airport Road.  Originally, the older upper section located east of College Street was known as "Melrose Heights" or "Westmount" and the newer lower area west of it "Melrose Gardens."

Moneta
The area of Timmins south of downtown.  It has a high concentration of people of Italian descent.  Flora Macdonald Public School was originally called Moneta Public School.  There is a Moneta Avenue and the Moneta Hotel, a bar/restaurant located on Pine Street South both within Moneta.

Mountjoy
Mountjoy, which comprises all of the city's populated area lying west of the Mattagami River, includes the Timmins Square shopping mall, Home Depot, Canadian Tire, Mark's, Best Buy, Staples and a Walmart Supercentre.  Franco-Ontarians make up the vast majority of Mountjoy's population.  It was originally known as "Mountjoy Township" and was separate from Timmins until amalgamation in 1973. Also found in the Mountjoy, Le Domaine Beaurivage or more commonly known as Bonaventure Drive, is one of the city's most prominent neighbourhoods and is located on the riverbank of the Mattagami River.

Porcupine

Situated at the eastern end of Porcupine Lake, just northeast of the community of South Porcupine. Porcupine represents the easternmost part of the city's urban core.  It was originally known as "Golden City" in its early days.  A fire devastated the area in 1911. The great fire engulfed communities from the Porcupine to Cochrane.  People fled to the lake to survive.  It was founded at the beginning of the Porcupine Gold Rush.  Porcupine, Pottsville and South Porcupine were the three towns making up the 12 mile portion of gold-bearing land known as the Porcupine Camp.

Pottsville

Located on the northwest portion of Porcupine Lake west of the bridge over the Porcupine River.  Located between Porcupine and South Porcupine, it constituted one of three towns making up the Porcupine camp during the Porcupine Gold Rush.  

It was not originally considered to be part of Porcupine but is today.  Some people consider newer neighbourhoods (Melview and Woodlands subdivisions) located to the west within Whitney Township behind the Porcupine Mall to be part of Pottsville but many disagree.  The Ontario Government Complex which services the Timmins area is located here.

Schumacher

Schumacher, once known as Aura Lake, is named after early settler and mining prospector Fredrick W. Schumacher, who sank the first mine shaft in the community during the Porcupine Gold Rush. It was once home to one of Canada's largest Croatian communities.  Although it still has many people of Croatian and other European descent, more recently, many people of Aboriginal heritage (mainly Cree) have taken up residence.  Schumacher was part of Tisdale Township until the township was amalgamated into the City of Timmins in 1973.

Porcupine Gold Mines is currently engaged in a surface diamond drilling program on the previous Hollinger and McIntyre properties. This activity aims to better determine the location and extent of underground mine workings in the area, which have caused sinkholes to appear. In addition, it is done to evaluate the potential to mine remnant gold mineralization as part of a possible future open-pit mining operation. The ongoing evaluation of the properties is part of the closure planning process that Porcupine Gold Mines is completing for the Ministry of Northern Development and Mines.  Preliminary indications show the possibility of more than 4 million ounces of gold in the area.

The area is also home to the McIntyre mine and the McIntyre Community Building, the primary sporting facility in Timmins, both of which were named for another early prospector, Sandy McIntyre. The McIntyre arena is also where Schumacher's most famous resident first donned his skates; Frank Mahovlich, a Liberal Party of Canada Senator, National Hockey League Hall of Fame member, and recipient of the Order of Canada, was born in Schumacher. Mahovlich's NHL contemporary, Dean Prentice, was also born in Schumacher.
This arena was also where Canada's own Barbara-Ann Scott taught figure skating in the 1950s.

Gold Centre

Gold Centre is a small planned town site situated just a half km southeast of Schumacher.  The town site though small is still an active community of less than 100 residents today.  Although still identified by its name, many consider it to be a part of Schumacher.

South Porcupine

South Porcupine was founded on the southwestern shore of Porcupine Lake, due to its proximity to the mines. Locally, South Porcupine is traditionally known as "South End" and also more recently called "SoPo".

The arrival of the Temiskaming & Northern Ontario Railway (T&NO) rail system in 1911 accelerated the growth of the area; until then, the trek to the South Porcupine was done by canoe and by foot from Haileybury. That same year, (two days after the first train arrived in the South Porcupine), the entire area was destroyed in the fire of 1911. Because of the importance of the gold discoveries, very few people abandoned the area and it was rebuilt in two months.

The Township of Tisdale, which later included the townsite of Schumacher (established in 1911) and the town of South Porcupine, was incorporated in 1909. The Township was later amalgamated and became part of Timmins.

Notable people from South Porcupine include Jim Prentice, Gordon Thiessen, Bob Nevin, Murray Costello, Don Lever, Pete Babando, Bruce McCaffrey, Danny Belisle, Les Costello, Clayton Hill (drummer), Nancy Baxter

Connaught Hill

A neighbourhood found within South Porcupine at its southernmost portion.  It is located near the southwestern part of Porcupine Lake.  It is not to be confused with the village of Connaught located within city limits on Frederick House Lake.  It was built on a small hill as its name suggests.  A railroad station once existed at the bottom of the hill.

Mining property neighbourhoods

Buffalo Ankerite
Buffalo Ankerite is an old mining area and there are some homes. There is also a lake near by. If you continued down the road you would reach the GoldCorp mining area.

Delnite

Former neighbourhoods demolished due to mining activity

Aunor

Dome Property

Dome Extension
Often called "Dome Ex", it was an abandoned residential community which surrounded the Dome Mine.
It was "abandoned" due to the company evicting the residents in order to open pit mine the area

Hallnor Mine Town site
The Hallnor Mine Site was a small settlement, which housed workers of the nearby Pamour mine. In the late 1990s and early 2000s, the residents of the houses were evicted due to the expansion of the open pit mining operation.

Pamour
Pamour was a small settlement, which housed workers of the nearby Pamour mine. Through the 1980s and 1990s, the houses were abandoned and then razed due to the expansion of the open pit mining operation. The site was eventually entirely engulfed by the pit.

Preston Property

Notable people 

 Jim Prentice, 16th Premier of Alberta.  September 15, 2014 – May 24, 2015. (South Porcupine)

References

Geography of Timmins
Populated places in Cochrane District
Neighbourhoods in Ontario